Close to the Horizon is a 2019 romantic drama film directed by Tim Trachte, starring Jannik Schümann and Luna Wedler, based on the 2017 best-selling novel So Near the Horizon by Jessica Koch.

Plot 
18-year-old Jessica Koch falls head over heels in love with kickboxer and model Danny Taylor. However, behind his outwardly perfect facade lies a deeply traumatized person. Danny is a survivor of severe physical abuse and child sexual abuse by his father who infected him with HIV. Realizing that it is almost impossible for him to have a normal relationship, Danny blocks Jessica's attempts to get close to him, deliberately hurting her. However, the young woman does not give up. Initially, Jessica is unaware of Danny's past and illness, but notices his strange behavior in certain situations, such as when they have a bicycle accident, or his fear of physical intimacy. When an argument leads to him disclosing his childhood trauma and his HIV status to her, Jessica has some difficult life decisions to make.

Cast 

 Jannik Schümann as Danny
 Luna Wedler as Jessica
 Stephan Kampwirth as Jessica's father
 Victoria Mayer as Jessica's mother
 Luise Befort as Tina
 Denis Moschitto as Jörg
 Frederick Lau as Danny's coach

Production 
Koch's novel Dem Horizont so nah was first released as an e-book in Germany in 2016, becoming a bestseller. It was later released in print, followed by two other books, forming the trilogy series Danny–Trilogie. The second book in the trilogy focuses on Danny's growing up and the roots of his childhood trauma. Jannik Schümann, who portrayed Danny, stated that reading about the childhood sexual abuse in detail made him "furious" but helped him prepare for the role mentally.

The filming took place in September and November 2018 in Cologne, Munich, and Portugal.

The first trailer was presented in early July 2019. The film was released theatrically on October 10, 2019.

Jannik Schümann starring as Danny received the Jupiter Award for Best Actor.

Accolades 

 Jannik Schümann as Danny, Jupiter Award 2019 for Best Actor.

References

External links 

 

2010s coming-of-age drama films
2019 romantic drama films
2010s teen drama films
2010s teen romance films
2019 films
Coming-of-age romance films
Films based on German novels
Films based on romance novels
Films based on young adult literature
German coming-of-age drama films
German romantic drama films
German teen drama films
2010s German-language films
2010s German films